Conductive ink is an ink that results in a printed object which conducts electricity. It is typically created by infusing graphite or other conductive materials into ink. There has been a growing interest in replacing metallic materials with nanomaterials due to the emergence of nanotechnology. Among other nanomaterials, graphene, and carbon nanotube-based conductive ink are gaining immense popularity due to their high electrical conductivity and high surface area.  Recently, more attention has been paid on using eco-friendly conductive ink using water as a solvent as compared to organic solvents since they are harmful to the environment. However, the high surface tension of water prevents its applicability. Various natural and synthetic surfactants are now used to reduce the surface tension of water and ensure uniform nanomaterials dispersibility for smooth printing and wide application.

Silver inks have multiple uses today including printing RFID tags as used in modern transit tickets, they can be used to improvise or repair circuits on printed circuit boards. Computer keyboards contain membranes with printed circuits that sense when a key is pressed. Windshield defrosters consisting of resistive traces applied to the glass are also printed.

See also 
 Circuit Scribe
 Etching
 Organic solar cell
 Plextronics
 Teledeltos

References 

Electrical components
Inks